The 2018 Women's World Nine-ball Championship was a professional nine-ball pool tournament that took place in Sanya, China from 3 to 9 December 2018.

The event was entered by 64 participants who were initially divided into 8 groups of 8 players, in which they competed against each other from December 3 to 5 in a double elimination tournament. Four players in each group qualified for the final round, which was played from December 6 to 9. The event was played under "alternating break" format with 3-point break rule and one ball on the foot spot.

Han Yu won the title with a 9–6 victory over Wang Xiaotong in the final. It was Han Yu's third Women's World Nine-ball Championship win, following her previous in 2013 and 2016.

Preliminary round – Double elimination 
In the group stage, the double elimination format was played with race to 7 and alternate break.

Group A

Group B

Group C

Group D

Group E

Group F

Group G

Group H

Main tournament – Single elimination 
Knockout stage consisted of last 32 players. Defending champion Siming Chen was defeated by Fu Xiaofang in quarter-finals in a hill-hill match.

Final 
Final was played between two Chinese players – Han Yu and Wang Xiaotong. Alternate break format was played, Han Yu won the lag. Both players played three break-and-runs: Han Yu in racks no. 5, 12 and 14; Wang Xiaotong in racks no. 6, 9 a 13.

References 

WPA World Nine-ball Championship
Women's world championships
2018 in Chinese women's sport